Sinúfana (Cenufana; also Cenu/Zenu/Sinú) is an extinct, poorly attested, and possibly Chocoan language of Colombia.

References

Choco languages
Languages of Colombia
Extinct languages of South America
Unclassified languages of South America